Hunan Road Commercial Street (湖南路购物街) is located in the northwest of the downtown area of Nanjing, lying in the Gulou District area. Its total length is 1,100 meters, and road width is 30 meters. There are all kinds of shops on 238 Street, of which brand and boutique stores account for 83% of the total business area of 87,000 square meters. Hunan Road is one of the most bustling commercial streets of the ancient Nanjing city.

History

Construction
Hunan Road extension was built in 1927, at which time Nanjing was the capital of the Republic of China. Some of the new extensions of the road were named according to their geographical position, or the provincial or city name. In this way, the new extension of the road was named Hunan Road.

Political events
In the time of the Republic of China, Hunan Road was a compelling place. The Senate Interim Government of the Republic of China and the KMT headquarters had put their offices in this road. Several important events have occurred here, such as:
 Organizing the central provisional government
 Electing Provisional President of the Republic of China, Sun Yat-sen
 Sun Fengming's assassination attempt on Wang Ching-wei
 Chen Bray's suicide

Sun Fengming's assassination attempt on Wang Ching-wei is especially noteworthy because it ignited the country and the world. It was a sensational event that shocked the world,

Lion Bridge Walk Food Street
Lion Bridge Walk Food Street is located in the middle of Hunan Road. It is one line of five branch roads of Hunan Road. Its length is 330 meters, and width is 12–16 meters. The street was originally a farmer's market. In early 2000, the Gulou District invested 8.8 million yuan for comprehensive reform. This included a full range of granite paving, a new color landscape dry fountain, planters, landscape lights, lounge chairs, public telephone kiosks and other public facilities. All residential buildings along the street applied for new European technology and put a Lion landmark on the buildings.

Lion Walk Food Street units include financial, lighting, automation, landscaping and cleaning. It has gathered nearly 40 businesses, including food, restaurants and noodles. In a trial operation from June 2000 to the end of 2000, the whole turnover was 48 million yuan and rent of $2.4 million was paid. In the first 6 months of 2001, the total turnover was more than 52 million and  2.52 million yuan was turned over to rent. Lion Bridge Walk Food Street has not only become a gathering place for the new food and beverage businesses, it has also become a shining star of the Hunan Road.

References

Transport in Nanjing
Streets in China